The National Speleological Society (NSS) is an organization formed in 1941 to advance the exploration, conservation, study, and understanding of caves in the United States. Originally headquartered in Washington D.C., its current offices are in Huntsville, Alabama. The organization engages in the research and scientific study, restoration, exploration, and protection of caves. It has more than 10,000 members in more than 250 grottos.

History
The Speleological Society of the District of Columbia (SSDC) was formed on May 6, 1939 by Bill Stephenson.  In the fall of 1940, the officers of the SSDC drafted a proposed constitution that would transform the SSDC into the National Speleological Society.  On January 24, 1941, Stephenson sent a letter to all members of the SSDC announcing that "on January 1 the Society was reorganized as a national organization." The New England Grotto was the first NSS Grotto. It was chartered in 1941 with Clay Perry as president and Ned Anderson as vice president.

On February 6, 1974, a pioneering cave diver named Sheck Exley became the first chairman of the Cave Diving Section of the National Speleological Society. The new section began with 21 members in 10 different states.

Publications
The NSS produces a number of publications, including:
NSS News, monthly
 Journal of Cave and Karst Studies (quarterly), formerly NSS Bulletin (from 1940–1995).
Membership Manual, yearly
American Caving Accidents, every few years
The NSS's list of long and deep caves was kept until 2022 by surveyor and cartographer Robert Gulden.

Organization 

The organization is currently divided into 11 regions:

Arizona Regional Association (ARA)
Mid-Appalachian Region (MAR)
Mississippi Valley-Ozark Region (MVOR)
Northeastern Regional Organization (NRO)
Northwest Caving Association (NCA)
Rocky Mountain Region
Southeastern Regional Association (SERA)
Southwestern Region (SWR)
Texas Speleological Association (TSA)
Virginia Region (VAR)
Western Region

Within these regions are local chapters known as grottos. The grottos carry out the local-level recreational and conservation-related business of the NSS. They generally function as the local NSS chapter/club. Many Grottos however operate in areas outside of their local area, with many operating in several states. Most Grottos also participate in Regions that are loose associations of Grottos. Regions are also an internal organization of the National Speleological Society.

Grottos are required to meet certain organizational requirements as outlined by the National Speleological Society. These include:
 A constitution and bylaws that are submitted to, and approved by, the NSS.
 A minimum of at least five members of the Society.
 It is NSS policy that full membership in a Grotto requires NSS membership.  However, in practice, this is often not the case.

Convention
The NSS hosts a yearly convention, which is generally held in June. Grottos take turns hosting the convention.

Awards
The Society makes a series of awards, presented during its annual convention:

 William J. Stephenson Award for outstanding service
 Honorary member award
 Lew Bicking award
 Victor A. Schmidt conservation award
 Science award
 Spelean arts and letters award
 Certificate of merit
 Fellow of the society
 Peter M. Hauer spelean history award
 James G. Mitchell award
 NCA best paper on a show cave award
 Certificate of appreciation

Photos

See also

References

External links
The National Speleological Society
Journal of Cave and Karst Studies (National Speleological Society)

Caving organizations in the United States
Scientific societies based in the United States
Cave conservancies
Organizations based in Alabama